Qamar Abbas (born 1 September 1989, Faisalabad) is a freestyle wrestler from Pakistan.

Career
At the 2014 Commonwealth Games in Glasgow, Abbas reached the final of the 74 kg freestyle event, where he lost to India's Sushil Kumar.

References

1989 births
Living people
Pakistani male sport wrestlers
Commonwealth Games silver medallists for Pakistan
Commonwealth Games medallists in wrestling
Wrestlers at the 2014 Commonwealth Games
Sportspeople from Faisalabad
21st-century Pakistani people
Medallists at the 2014 Commonwealth Games